Vendémiaire was a  built for the French Navy (Marine Nationale) in the late 1900s. She was sunk with all hands when she was rammed by the pre-dreadnought battleship  on 8 June 1912 while on maneuvers off the Casquets in the English Channel.

Design and description
The Pluviôse class were built as part of the French Navy's 1905 building program to a double-hull design by Maxime Laubeuf. The submarines displaced  surfaced and  submerged. Their crew numbered 2 officers and 23 enlisted men.

For surface running, the boats were powered by two  triple-expansion steam engines, each driving one propeller shaft using steam provided by two Du Temple boilers. When submerged each propeller was driven by a  electric motor.

The first six boats completed were armed with a single  internal bow torpedo tube; Vendémiare had one fitted in early 1910 while she was still under construction. All of the boats were fitted with six 450 mm external torpedo launchers; the pair firing forward were fixed outwards at an angle of seven degrees and the rear pair had an angle of five degrees. Following a ministerial order on 22 February 1910, the aft tubes were reversed so they too fired forward, but at an angle of eight degrees. The other launchers were a rotating pair of Drzewiecki drop collars in a single mount positioned on top of the hull at the stern. They could traverse 150 degrees to each side of the boat. The Pluviôse-class submarines carried eight torpedoes.

Construction and career
Vendémiaire, named after the first month of the French Republican calendar, was ordered on 26 August 1905 from the Arsenal de Cherbourg. The submarine was laid down in 1906, launched on 7 July 1910 and commissioned on 4 February 1911.

Vendémiaire sank with the loss of her entire crew of 24 on 8 June 1912 after colliding with the battleship  in the English Channel off the Casquets during maneuvers.

Notes

Bibliography

External links
 French Submarines: 1863 - Now
 Castel, Marc: Vendémiaire at Sous-marins Français 1863 (French)

Pluviôse-class submarines
Ships built in France
1907 ships
Maritime incidents in 1912
Submarines sunk in collisions
Warships lost with all hands
French submarine accidents
Lost submarines of France
Shipwrecks in the English Channel